Unión Deportiva Altea is a Spanish football team based in Altea, in the Valencian Community. It was founded in 1962, and plays in Primera Regional, holding home matches at Garganes stadium, which has a capacity of 2,000 seats.

Season to season

1 season in Tercera División
49 seasons in Categorías Regionales

External links
ffcv.es profile 
Futbolme.com profile 

Football clubs in the Valencian Community
Association football clubs established in 1962
Divisiones Regionales de Fútbol clubs
1962 establishments in Spain
Province of Alicante